João de Matos Moura Lourenço (born 8 April 1942) is a Portuguese former footballer who played as a striker.

Club career
Born in Alcobaça, Leiria District, Lourenço started playing football in 1960 with local G.C. Alcobaça. After one season, he signed for Associação Académica de Coimbra.

In the summer of 1964, Lourenço joined Primeira Liga club Sporting CP. He remained in Lisbon eight years, winning the 1966 and 1970 national championships.

Lourenço retired in June 1972 aged only 30, having scored 145 goals in 219 competitive matches for the Lions including 93 in the league. In a rainy afternoon in October 1965, he netted four times in a 4–2 away win against S.L. Benfica as Sporting went on to win the domestic championship; in European competition he added 18, only being surpassed many years later by Liédson.

International career
Lourenço was a member of the Portugal squad that participated in the 1966 FIFA World Cup in England, but did not make any appearance in the competition for the third-placed team, eventually being the only player called for the tournament that would never be capped.

References

External links

1942 births
Living people
People from Alcobaça, Portugal
Sportspeople from Leiria District
Portuguese footballers
Association football forwards
Primeira Liga players
G.C. Alcobaça players
Associação Académica de Coimbra – O.A.F. players
Sporting CP footballers
Portugal youth international footballers
Portugal under-21 international footballers
Portugal B international footballers
1966 FIFA World Cup players